Charlotte Ayanna (born Charlotte Lopez; September 25, 1976) is a Puerto Rican-American actress, author and beauty queen who won Miss Teen USA.

Early life
Ayanna was born in San Juan, Puerto Rico, but moved to Vermont at an early age. She had a troubled childhood, spending sixteen years in foster homes after her mother, Emma, was judged to be mentally unfit to look after her children. In 1994, at age 17, she was adopted into a foster home. She has since become a spokeswoman for foster children.

Education
Attended the University of California, Irvine.

Career
Her first national exposure was in 1993, when she became Miss Teen USA.  Charlotte co-authored a book titled Lost in the System, published in 1996, detailing her childhood and subsequent rise to Miss Teen USA.  She later changed her last name to "Ayanna", meaning "blessed" in Cherokee.

Following her pageant victory, she made guest appearances on television shows including Weird Science and Entourage.  She also appeared in the music video for fellow Puerto Rican Ricky Martín's hit She's All I Ever Had. She also starred opposite Martin Freeman in the Parisian band, Ilya's music video, Bellissima.

Her film roles include Jawbreaker (1999), The Rage: Carrie 2 (1999), Dancing at the Blue Iguana (2000), Kate & Leopold (2001), Training Day (as Ethan Hawke's wife), and Love the Hard Way (2003) with Adrien Brody.  She also starred with Sean Patrick Flanery as the sexy vampiress in the horror-made-for-DVD movie The Insatiable (2007).

Filmography

Film

Television

Awards and nominations
In 2002 she won the Best Actress award at the Valenciennes International Festival of Action and Adventure Films for Love the Hard Way (2001) tied with Kajol for Kabhi Khushi Kabhie Gham... (2001).

See also 

List of Puerto Ricans

Further reading

References

External links
 
 

1976 births
Living people
People from San Juan, Puerto Rico
American film actresses
American actresses of Puerto Rican descent
American television actresses
Beauty pageant contestants from Vermont
Miss Teen USA winners